Ṭ (minuscule: ṭ) is a letter of the Latin alphabet, formed from T with the addition of a dot below the letter. 

It is used in the orthography of the Mizo language and is pronounced almost like a 'tr' as it sounds in English. Although the Mizo language has both a separate 't' and 'r' in its alphabet, they are not used in the combination 'tr' and a Ṭ or ṭ is used instead. 

It is used in the transcription of Afro-Asiatic languages to represent an "emphatic t", in romanization of Arabic and Syriac, and in the Berber Latin alphabets. 
In the transcription of Arabic, it corresponds to the letter ṭāʾ (ط).
It is also used in the Bhojpuri language as a single consonant to represent 'tr'. 

In transliterating Indo-Aryan, East Iranian and Dravidian languages it represents a retroflex t. It was also formerly used for the same sound in Javanese, but has now been replaced by the digraph "th". It is used in writing the letters ṭ and ṭh of Pali, an important language in Theravada Buddhism. It is also used for literature for Chin Language. It is after T in the alphabets, as it is pronounced differently from T.

Encoding

Latin letters with diacritics
Aramaic languages
Eastern Aramaic languages
Neo-Aramaic languages